Miss America 1961, the 34th Miss America pageant, was held at the Boardwalk Hall in Atlantic City, New Jersey on September 10, 1960 on CBS.

The telecast was watched by a reported 85 million viewers. Nancy Fleming, the winner as Miss Michigan, later became a television personality and the wife of Jim Lange, host of TV's The Dating Game.

Results

Order of announcements

Top 10

Top 5

Awards

Preliminary awards

Other awards

Contestants

External links
 Miss America official website

1961
1960 in the United States
1961 beauty pageants
1960 in New Jersey
September 1960 events in the United States
Events in Atlantic City, New Jersey